Godani is a village in Shaheed Bhagat Singh Nagar district of Punjab State, India. The village is administrated by Sarpanch an elected representative of the village.

Demography 
As of 2011, Godani has a total number of 111 houses and population of 428 of which 234 include are males while 194 are females according to the report published by Census India in 2011. The literacy rate of Godani is 63.73%, lower than the state average of 75.84%. The population of children under the age of 6 years is 53 which is 12.38% of total population of Godani, and child sex ratio is approximately 1038 as compared to Punjab state average of 846.

Most of the people are from Schedule Caste which constitutes 54.44% of total population in Godani. The town does not have any Schedule Tribe population so far.

As per the report published by Census India in 2011, 181 people were engaged in work activities out of the total population of Godani which includes 153 males and 28 females. According to census survey report 2011, 99.45% workers describe their work as main work and 0.55% workers are involved in Marginal activity providing livelihood for less than 6 months.

Education 
Amardeep Singh Shergill Memorial college Mukandpur and Sikh National College Banga are the nearest colleges.

Transport 

See also 
List of villages in India

References

External links 
 Tourism of Punjab
 Census of Punjab
 Locality Based PINCode

Villages in Shaheed Bhagat Singh Nagar district